Emerald Ford "Buck" Lamme (July 2, 1905 – September 4, 1957) was an American three-sport athlete: professional basketball and football, and minor league baseball. He played collegiately at Ohio Wesleyan University, and Lamme also later spent several years coaching high school basketball.

Professional careers

Football
Lamme's professional football career was just one game in the National Football League. He played for the Cleveland Indians in 1931, the only season the franchise existed. Lamme played the end position.

Basketball
Lamme's basketball career spanned independent leagues, the National Professional Basketball League, Midwest Basketball Conference, and the National Basketball League (NBL) from the late 1920s to the mid-1940s. A guard, he appeared in only one NBL game, for Columbus Athletic Supply, but did not register a field goal.

Baseball
Preceding both his professional football and basketball careers with a stint playing minor league baseball. He competed for the Akron Tyrites in 1928. In 28 games as a first baseman he registered a .244 batting average in 90 at-bats.

Death
In 1957, Lamme was found dead at the foot of the O'Shaughnessy Dam in Dublin, Ohio. He had jumped to his death and it was reported as suicide. He was the owner of the Brown Jug Restaurant in Delaware, Ohio, at the time of his death.

References

1905 births
1957 deaths
Akron Tyrites players
American football ends
American men's basketball players
Baseball first basemen
Baseball players from Ohio
Basketball players from Ohio
Cleveland Indians (NFL 1931) players
Columbus Athletic Supply players
Guards (basketball)
High school basketball coaches in Ohio
People from Delaware, Ohio
Players of American football from Ohio
Ohio Wesleyan Battling Bishops baseball players
Ohio Wesleyan Battling Bishops football players
Ohio Wesleyan Battling Bishops men's basketball players
Suicides by jumping in the United States
Suicides in Ohio